Since England women's first Women's One Day International (ODI) in 1973, 141 players have represented the team. A One Day International (ODI) is an international cricket match between two representative teams, each having ODI status, as determined by the International Cricket Council (ICC). An ODI differs from Test matches in that the number of overs per team is limited, and that each team has only one innings. The list is arranged in the order in which each player won her first ODI cap. Where more than one player won her first ODI cap in the same match, those players are listed alphabetically by surname.

Key

Players
Statistics are correct as on 9 December 2022.

Notes

References

 
England ODI
Cricket Women ODI
Cricketers
Cricket